George Ryden (14 July 1940 – 12 December 2021) was a Scottish footballer who played as a centre-half for Dundee, St Johnstone and Stirling Albion. Ryden played for Dundee in the 1964 Scottish Cup Final, which they lost 3–1 to Rangers. He died on 12 December 2021, at the age of 81.

References

External links

1940 births
2021 deaths
Sportspeople from Dumbarton
Footballers from West Dunbartonshire
Scottish footballers
Association football central defenders
Dundee F.C. players
St Johnstone F.C. players
Stirling Albion F.C. players
Scottish Football League players
Duntocher Hibernian F.C. players